General Menéndez may refer to:

Benjamín Menéndez (1885–1975), Argentine Army brigadier general
Leopoldo Menéndez (1891–1965), Spanish Republican Army general
Luciano Benjamín Menéndez (1927–2018), Argentine Army general
Mario Benjamín Menéndez (1930–2015), Argentine Army brigadier general